Centre Party or Center Party may refer to:

Active parties
 Åland Centre
 Centre Alliance
 Centre (Croatian political party)
 Estonian Centre Party
 Centre Party (Faroe Islands)
 Centre Party (Finland)
 Centre Party (Germany)
 Centre Party (Hungary)
 Centre Party (Iceland)
 Center Party (Iraq)
 Lithuanian Centre Party
 Centre Party (Nauru)
 Centre Party (Norway)
 Centre Party (Poland)
 Centre Party (Sweden)
 Centre Party (Turkey)

Historical parties
Centre Party (Greenland)
Centre Party (Israel)
Centre Party (Jersey)
Centre Party (Netherlands)
Centre Party '86
Centre Party (New South Wales)
Centre Party (Rhodesia)
Centre Party (Sweden, 1924)
Centre Party (Tasmania)
Commonwealth Centre Party
National Centre Party (Ireland)

See also
 Centrism
 Nordic agrarian parties